Stavroula Kozompoli (born January 14, 1974) is a female Greek water polo player and Olympic silver medalist with the Greece women's national water polo team.

She received a silver medal at the 2004 Summer Olympics in 2004 Athens.

She received a gold medal with the Greek team at the 2005 FINA Women's Water Polo World League in Kirishi.

She was top scorer (12 goals) at the 2004 FINA Women's Water Polo World League in Long Beach, California with Tania di Mario, where Greece finished 6th.

See also
 Greece women's Olympic water polo team records and statistics
 List of Olympic medalists in water polo (women)

References

External links
 

1974 births
Living people
Greek female water polo players
Olympic water polo players of Greece
Water polo players at the 2004 Summer Olympics
Water polo players at the 2008 Summer Olympics
Olympic silver medalists for Greece
Olympic medalists in water polo
Medalists at the 2004 Summer Olympics
Water polo players from Athens
21st-century Greek women